Beauvoir-sur-Mer (literally Beauvoir on Sea) is a commune in the Vendée department in the administrative region of the Pays de la Loire, France.

See also
Communes of the Vendée department

References

Communes of Vendée
Populated coastal places in France